Mori Chack (森チャック Mori Chakku, born on March 23, 1973) is the artist name of a Japanese graphic designer, who was born in Sakai, Osaka, Japan. He is famous for his Chax product line, and especially the character Gloomy Bear, a 2 m tall, violent, pink bear that eats humans. The design is an antithesis to the excessively cute products produced by Disney, Sanrio, and other companies. Mori Chack believes that humans and animals are incompatible, and an animal is wild by nature. This is expressed most pronouncedly by the Gloomy Bear, which is often shown blood stained and attacking humans. Gloomy Bear is also available in different colors with slightly different designs.

From the Cube Works press release:
 Gloomy, an abandoned little bear, is rescued by Pitty (the little boy). At first, he is cute and cuddly, but becomes more wild as he grows up. Since bears do not become attached to people like dogs by nature, Gloomy attacks Pitty even though he is the owner. So Gloomy has blood on him from biting and/or scratching Pitty. The Gloomy with blood is called Chax Colony Edition. 

A segment on Gloomy Bear and a short interview with Mori Chack are featured in Episode 6 of Series 2 of the BBC Three series Japanorama. The topic of the episode was "Kawaii", which is Japanese for "cute".

Mori Chack also created other characters in a similar style, as for example Podolly, a sheep in a wolf skin, reversing the common phrase of a wolf in a sheep skin, and Kumakikai, a robo-gloomy with rockets for feet and a soft silver vinyl body. Often, his graphics also carry a political message, as for example the drawing of the Statue of Liberty, except the figure is holding a molotov cocktail and a sign with the question "Free?".

His products are famous in Japan. He also has an elder brother, and a younger sister, who also work in graphic design.

The character Gloomy Bear is receiving a TV anime in April 2021.

References

External links 
 Chax.cc official site, in Japanese and English
 Mori Chack on Vinyl-Creep

Art toys
People from Sakai, Osaka
1973 births
Living people
Japanese graphic designers